"" (coffee for all, or coffee for everyone) is a popular expression in Spain that has the sense of offering the same treatment to all parties involved in an issue in order to please (or displease) everyone equally. It was pronounced for the first time by Manuel Clavero Arévalo, minister between 1977 and 1980, that is, during the Spanish Transition to democracy. At this time Spain was going from dictatorship to democracy and one of the great debates about the formation of the new nation was whether to form a centralist or federalist government, since certain regions demanded greater autonomy. The supposedly "neutral" solution was to offer autonomy to all regions.

The configuration of the Spanish territory was inspired by the systems of Germany and Italy. Manuel Clavero was Minister of Regions during the first democratic government of Adolfo Suárez, and in his hand was the design of the new national map. The autonomous communities of Spain could choose between a full and a limited level of independence, but they all have self-government. The expression  has been fixed as a figuration of the current territorial model of Spain.

See also 
 First government of Adolfo Suárez
 Nationalities and regions of Spain

References

External links 

 

1978 in Spain
Coffee culture
Political catchphrases
Spanish transition to democracy
Spanish words and phrases
Political compromises in Spain
1978 neologisms